Now & Forever is a 2002 romance film directed by Bob Clark.

Plot
Against a backdrop of clashing cultures, John Myron (Adam Beach) and Angela Wilson (Mia Kirshner) find each other and over the years form a powerful bond. One tragic night, John rescues Angela from a wicked act of betrayal. Faced with its aftermath, Angela flees town, unaware that she has put into motion a dramatic and intense string of events that will forever change the course of their lives. Harboring a secret, John guides Angela to a shocking realization that will uncover the past. It is a dramatic contemporary love story combining elements of spirituality, heart and integrity.

Cast
 Mia Kirshner as Angela Wilson
 Adam Beach as John Myron
 Gordon Tootoosis as Ghost Fox
 Theresa Russell as Dori Wilson
 Gabriel Olds as T.J. Bolt
 Callum Keith Rennie as Carl Mackie
 Simon R. Baker as Young John Myron
 Alexandria Purvis as Young Angela
 Nicholas Treeshin as Jake Dube
 Benson McCulloch as Brian Pressman
 Rob Roy as Alex Wilson
 Lyndon Linklater as Older Boy
 Bernelda Wheeler as Old Woman
 Dan MacDonald as Director
 Kent Allen as Max
 Calvin Chiefcalf as Reservation Officer
 Louisa Ferguson as Movie Director
 Colin Semenoff as Actor T.J.
 David Millbern as Guardian
 Stephan Fuchs as Actor T.J. (uncredited)
List is from IMDB

Reception
On review aggregator Rotten Tomatoes it holds a 17% based on 12 reviews On Metacritic it holds a 27 out of 100 based on 6 reviews indicating “generally unfavorable reviews”

References

External links

2002 films
Films scored by Paul Zaza
Films directed by Bob Clark
2000s romance films
2000s English-language films